Charles Edward Mapes (born 4 July 1982) is an English former professional footballer best known for playing in The Football League for Wycombe Wanderers, and in the Scottish Football League for Greenock Morton.

Club career

Early career
Born in West Hampstead, Mapes played for both Tottenham Hotspur and Cardiff City at youth level, before beginning his senior career at Harrow Borough in 2001. Following this, he had a trial spell at Greenock Morton in 2002, during which he made 2 appearances, before spells at non-league sides Edgware Town, Wealdstone and Berkhamsted Town.

Wycombe Wanderers
In summer 2003, Mapes joined Second Division side Wycombe Wanderers where he signed a professional contract. He scored for Wycombe on his debut against Stockport County on the opening game of the 2003–04 season. He made 18 appearances in all competitions for Wycombe Wanderers and scored three goals.

Crawley Town
In the summer of 2004, he joined Conference Premier side Crawley Town. He started in Crawley's first game of the season, and remained a regular player early in the season. He requested a transfer away from Crawley due to a lack of regular football in February 2005, with Mapes saying, "I am 22 and I need to be playing regular football" and that "if I can't get it at Crawley then I will have to go somewhere else." In March 2005, he joined Canvey Island on loan, before being recalled in April 2005. Mapes was released by Crawley Town at the end of the 2004–05 season after making 36 appearances in all competitions for the club.

Later career
Following his departure from Crawley Town, Mapes signed for Yeading in June 2005. He joined Hendon on loan until the end of the season in February 2006, where he scored once in 13 league appearances. He subsequently had spells at Hemel Hempstead Town and Barton Rovers before joining Hayes & Yeading United on dual registration in November 2007. In August 2008, he left Hayes & Yeading United, rejoining former club Hendon a few days later, and would go on to make 16 league appearances, scoring twice during this spell.

International career
Having once been called up to the Wales national under-17 team, he was called up to the England C team in October 2004 as part of a provisional 30-man squad for a match against Italy.

Personal life
His brother George also played senior football.

References

External links
 
 Charlie Mapes at hendonfc.net

English footballers
English Football League players
People from West Hampstead
1982 births
Living people
Harrow Borough F.C. players
Greenock Morton F.C. players
Wealdstone F.C. players
Edgware Town F.C. players
Berkhamsted Town F.C. players
Wycombe Wanderers F.C. players
Crawley Town F.C. players
Canvey Island F.C. players
Yeading F.C. players
Hendon F.C. players
Hemel Hempstead Town F.C. players
Barton Rovers F.C. players
Hayes & Yeading United F.C. players
Scottish Football League players
Association football midfielders
National League (English football) players